James Brinkley (born 13 March 1974 in Dunbartonshire) is a Scottish cricketer. He is a right-handed batsman and a right-arm medium-fast bowler. He played five One-day Internationals in May 1999. He played List A cricket until 2004 and participated in the 2001 ICC Trophy.

Brinkley was generally used as the opening bowler in the Scottish attack.

1974 births
Living people
Commonwealth Games competitors for Scotland
Cricketers at the 1998 Commonwealth Games
Cricketers at the 1999 Cricket World Cup
Cricketers from Argyll and Bute
Durham cricketers
Essex cricketers
Herefordshire cricketers
Matabeleland cricketers
People from Helensburgh
Scotland One Day International cricketers
Scottish cricketers
Worcestershire cricketers